"30 Rock: A One-Time Special" is a special episode of the American comedy television series 30 Rock, and the 139th overall episode of the series. It aired on NBC in the United States on July 16, 2020. The special served as NBC's 2020 upfront presentation and reunited cast members Tina Fey, Alec Baldwin, Tracy Morgan, Jane Krakowski, Scott Adsit, Judah Friedlander, and Jack McBrayer.

Plot
During the COVID-19 pandemic in 2020, Jack calls Liz to inform her that Kenneth Parcell, the now head of NBC, has asked them to reunite the cast for a TGS reboot on Peacock. Liz reaches out to the former writers of the show to see if they are interested, and they agree to participate. Liz also is able to recruit former stars Tracy Jordan and, despite initially avoiding her due to a series of public controversies, Jenna Maroney to return.

The gang virtually reunites to pitch it to Kenneth, but he refuses, revealing it was all a ruse to confront them about ignoring his several attempts to reunite virtually over Zoom. After being rejected, Jack reveals to Liz that he is bored of retirement and desperately wants to get back in the television game. Liz, Jack, Jenna, and Tracy all unite to crash Kenneth's speech during the NBC upfront. Kenneth gathers them in a private web room and realizes during their confrontation about his stunt that he's sick of being surrounded by "yes-persons" and missed having people be honest with him. Tracy and Jenna volunteer to lead the presentation while Kenneth shows Liz and Jack trailers for upcoming shows, to which they react with positivity.

After the presentation, Jack reveals to Liz that Kenneth has asked him to lead NBC's new female-centric streaming service Peahen and Liz reveals that Kenneth has asked her to write a new pilot.

Throughout the episode, promotions are made for several NBCUniversal properties, including Peacock, Universal Destinations & Experiences, Telemundo, NBC News, coverage of the rescheduled 2020 Summer Olympics, as well as upcoming new shows for the 2020–2021 television season.

Background
On June 16, 2020, NBC announced the network would air a new, remotely-produced special episode of the series.

On July 14, Vulture reported that most of NBC's major affiliate groups, including Tegna, Hearst Television, Sinclair Broadcast Group, Nexstar Media Group, and Gray Television, whose NBC affiliates together reach about half the United States' population, would be refusing to air the special due to its focus on NBCUniversal's streaming service, Peacock, which these owners believed could siphon viewers away from their stations. Certain affiliates did not air the episode, while others delayed it from its networked timeslot until the graveyard slot. The following day, it was made available on the NBC website and Peacock, and aired in primetime as part of a "roadblock" simulcast on several of NBCUniversal's cable channels.

Cast 
For the special, the entirety of the main cast of the series returned, as well as several recurring cast members. The special also saw the appearances of several stars from different NBCUniversal television properties.

Reception

Critical reception
The special received mixed reviews from critics. On Rotten Tomatoes, it holds a 31% approval rating based on 13 reviews, with an average rating of 7.33/10. The website's critical consensus is, "It's fun to see the gang back together, but this One-Time Special has a little too much corporate synergy and not enough of the show's sardonic wit." It holds a score of 49 on Metacritic based on 13 reviews, indicating "mixed or average reviews".

LaToya Ferguson of The A.V. Club commented upon the nature of the special given the show's recurring themes and in-universe portrayals of NBC itself, explaining that "a blatant hour-long commercial for television is technically the natural progression for the story 30 Rock told, which allows the special to somehow reach an even higher level of meta inception than it already had". Ferguson also praised the "seamless" nature of its videoconference-based scenes, and argued that although it was not the best episode of the series as a whole (if it could be considered an episode at all), "the fact that the story in between the ads actually works as a passable episode of 30 Rock only helps the special to do the job it’s really supposed to be doing: selling NBC Universal to advertisers (and viewers, as a distant second).""

Ratings
Preliminary ratings indicated the special episode scored a 0.4 rating in the 18–49 demographic, with an average of 2.49 million viewers in the 8–9 p.m. timeslot (averaging 0.4 and 2.8 million in the first half-hour and 0.3 and 2.1 million in the second). Final ratings, which accounted for local preemptions (in what is believed to be 60% of NBC's affiliates), revised the episode's audience down to 0.2 and 878,000 viewers (beaten by a Superstore re-run in the 9–9:30 p.m. timeslot after, and the second-lowest viewership of the night on the Big Four).

References

External links

2020 American television episodes
30 Rock episodes
Television episodes about television
Television episodes about the COVID-19 pandemic
Television episodes written by Tina Fey
Cultural responses to the COVID-19 pandemic
Screenlife films